is a railway station on the Chikuho Main Line operated by JR Kyushu in Kotake, Kurate District, Fukuoka, Japan.

History 
In the next phase of expansion, the track was extended southwards with Kotake being opened as the new southern terminus on 28 October 1892. On 1 October 1897, the Chikuho Kogyo Railway, now renamed the Chikuho Railway, merged with the Kyushu Railway. After the Kyushu Railway was nationalized on 1 July 1907, Japanese Government Railways (JGR) took over control of the station. On 12 October 1909, the station became part of the Chikuho Main Line With the privatization of Japanese National Railways (JNR), the successor of JGR, on 1 April 1987, control of the station passed to JR Kyushu.

Passenger statistics
In fiscal 2016, the station was used by an average of 700 passengers daily (boarding passengers only), and it ranked 205th among the busiest stations of JR Kyushu.

References

Railway stations in Fukuoka Prefecture
Railway stations in Japan opened in 1892